The Clare Courier was a bi-weekly newspaper based in Ballycasey, Shannon, County Clare, Ireland. It was published every second Thursday. It attracted readers mainly in southeast County Clare and the urban Shannon town area.

Eugene McCafferty served as Editor of the freesheet.

External links

1991 establishments in Ireland
Biweekly newspapers
Mass media in County Clare
Newspapers published in the Republic of Ireland
Publications established in 1991